Deep Run High School is a part magnet high school in Henrico County, Virginia, United States. It is named after Deep Run School, one of Henrico County's first schools which was a two-room schoolhouse that can still be found on the grounds of Short Pump Elementary School. The school had approximately over 1,700 students and over 76 faculty members during the 2015-16 school year. About 200 students are part of the Center for Information Technology, a highly competitive magnet program open to all county residents.

History
Deep Run High School was named after one of Henrico County's first schools: Deep Run School.  Deep Run School was a two-room schoolhouse that can still be found on the grounds of Short Pump Elementary School.  Deep Run High School is a celebration of Henrico County's 300th year of excellence.

In 2002, Deep Run opened its doors solely to freshmen and sophomores as the newest member of Henrico County's public schools.   While freshmen entered from neighboring middle schools (Short Pump Middle School and Pocahontas Middle School), incoming sophomores predominantly transferred from John Randolph Tucker High School. Deep Run reached full capacity during its 2004–2005 academic year and graduated its first class on June 16, 2005.

In 2007, Deep Run became overcrowded due to increased buildup of surrounding areas. To alleviate the problem, during the summer of 2008, six trailers were placed on school property for the 2008–2009 school year.  They were removed during the summer of 2010, when Glen Allen High School was opened.

Aaron Spence, Deep Run's first principal, resigned during the summer of 2008 to take over as Director of Curriculum and Instruction in Chesterfield County. Former Head Football Coach Lenny Pritchard was named acting principal for the 2008–2009 school year, and was subsequently appointed by the school board in April 2009 to remain principal.

On July 23, 2008, Sarah Palin came to Deep Run for a Republican rally. Over 8,000 people attended the event, which was held in the school's football stadium.

In 2012, Deep Run was selected as the 14th "Top School" in Virginia as ranked by U.S. News & World Report.  The same report ranked Deep Run 283rd in the United States. In 2013, Deep Run was selected as the 12th "Top School" in Virginia and the 265th best school in the United States. In 2016, Deep Run was named as the 8th "Top School" in Virginia and the 278th best school in the United States.

The Deep Run Men's Volleyball team won the class 5A State Title in 2017. The competition cheerleading team won the state championship in December 2019.

During the COVID-19 pandemic, the last day for in-person classes was March 13, 2020. Students completed some work online to finish out the school year. Classes stayed virtual for the school opening in September 2020. The school day was shortened by one hour after parents expressed concern over the number of hours students were spending on their laptops. On March 1 and 2, 2021, the school reopened for a small number of 9th graders who had opted back in to in-person instruction (via a form completed in November 2020.) The following Monday, March 8, 2021, upperclassmen who had opted in joined the 9th graders in-person for a modified schedule. Many seniors opted to stay virtual. Teachers taught the in-person and the virtual students at the same time. The school day remained shortened. Wednesdays remained virtual and were called "Wellness Wednesdays." Students were assigned 25 minutes of work per class on Wednesdays and were required to participate in a half hour "wellness" lesson. The Wildcat Weekly Newsletter dated March 10–16, 2021 indicated that "over 350" students had returned to the building out of "1,882." (Just under 20%.) Masks were required to be worn, and students were assigned seats far apart from one another during lunchtime.

On Wednesday, September 8, 2021, all Henrico County Schools, including Deep Run High School, fully reopened. Some restrictions, like mandatory masking, were still in place due to the Delta variant. The mask mandate was eventually lifted by the county on February 2, 2022.

Notable alumni

 Antone Exum, musician and former NFL safety
 Deck McGuire, MLB pitcher
 R. C. Orlan, MLB pitcher
Brian Ownby, soccer player
 Todd Wharton, soccer player

References

External links
 Deep Run High School website

Schools in Henrico County, Virginia
Public high schools in Virginia
Educational institutions established in 2002
2002 establishments in Virginia